Udolphus Aylmer Coates, OBE FRIBA (1908 – 2000) was a British town planner.

Life

He attended the University of Liverpool. Coates became the first town planning officer for the City of Hull and his new development plan helped the city recover from the blitz. He was also county planning officer for Lancashire. He was President of the Royal Town Planning Institute from 1958-1959. It was during his term that the Royal Town Planning Institute was granted a Royal Charter. He was awarded an OBE in 1963. In 1971, he retired as county planning officer for Lancashire and was succeeded by Jeffrey Rowbotham. Coates died in 2000.

References

1908 births
2000 deaths
Alumni of the University of Liverpool
Fellows of the Royal Institute of British Architects
British urban planners
Presidents of the Royal Town Planning Institute
People from Kingston upon Hull